The Sphinx-class sailing sixth rates were a series of ten post ships built to a 1773 design by John Williams. Although smaller than true frigates, post ships were often referred to incorrectly as frigates by sea officers, but not by the Admiralty or Navy Board. 

The first vessel in the class was launched in 1775, six more in 1776, two in 1777 and the last in 1781. The vessels of the class served in the Royal Navy during the American Revolutionary War. Three of them - Sphinx and Ariel in September 1779, and Unicorn in September 1780 - were captured by the French Navy, but Sphinx was recovered in December 1779 and Unicorn in April 1781. Some survived to see service in the French Revolutionary and Napoleonic Wars.

Ships in class

References

 Rif Winfield, British Warships in the Age of Sail, 1714-1792: Design, Construction, Careers and Fates, Seaforth Publishing, Barnsley (2007). .

 
Ship classes